Droué is a commune in the Loir-et-Cher department of central France.

It is 65 km northwest of Blois and is bordered on the south by the Egvonne, a tributary of the Loir.

Population

International relations
It is twinned with Rothwell in the United Kingdom and Gondelsheim in Germany.

See also
Communes of the Loir-et-Cher department

References

External links
Official Web site

Communes of Loir-et-Cher